Wenyingzhuangia fucanilytica is a Gram-negative, strictly aerobic, rod-shaped and non-motile bacterium from the genus of Wenyingzhuangia which has been isolated from seawater from the coast of Jiaozhou Bay.

References

Flavobacteria
Bacteria described in 2016